Ricardo Antonio Mayorga Perez (born October 3, 1973) is a Nicaraguan professional boxer and former mixed martial artist. In boxing he is a former two-weight world champion, having held the unified WBA (Unified), WBC, Ring magazine, and lineal welterweight titles in 2003, and the WBC super welterweight title from 2005 to 2006. Mayorga first became well known to boxing fans upon being featured on the cover of The Rings December 2003 issue, entitled "The craziest man in the sport: Mayorga lights up boxing." He has since maintained this infamous reputation with his relentless trash-talk in the build-up to most of his fights, as well as his smoking and drinking habits outside the ring.

Professional boxing career

Mayorga vs. Lewis
After defending the title against Larry Marks, Andrew Lewis took on Mayorga. The bout ended in the 2nd round and was ruled a No Contest due to a nasty cut on Lewis caused by accidental headbutt. Lewis's lost the title in a rematch to Mayorga in 2002 via 5th-round TKO.

Mayorga vs. Forrest I, II
In January 2003, Vernon Forrest (35-0-0) fought Mayorga.  Mayorga was a mostly unknown fringe contender from Nicaragua and few gave him a chance to win against the significantly bigger and stronger Forrest. Mayorga shocked the world when he easily dominated Forrest, dropping him once in the 1st round and again in the 3rd round. The referee would call off the fight after the second knockdown, as Forrest was visibly dazed and unable to get his footing.

Forrest would rematch Mayorga six months later, losing again, this time by a majority decision. The bout was close and competitive, with Mayorga mostly chasing Forrest around the ring while Forrest was content to fight from the outside.

Mayorga vs. Spinks
Cory Spinks (31-2-0) rose to boxing stardom by unifying the WBC, WBA, IBF, and The Ring lineal welterweight titles on December 13, 2003, when he defeated Mayorga by majority decision. Spinks was a 5 to 1 underdog going into the fight with Mayorga. The judges scored the fight 114–112, 117–109, 114-114, favoring Spinks.

Mayorga vs. Trinidad

Félix Trinidad (41-1-0) announced a comeback on March 2, 2004. On October 2, 2004, he fought against Mayorga, in Madison Square Garden. Early in the 1st round Mayorga was on the offensive connecting several combinations, later in the round Trinidad connected some punches to his opponent's face. Mayorga reacted defiantly while lowering his defense, which Trinidad used to continue the offensive during the closing seconds. In the 2nd round, Trinidad continued connecting with combinations to Mayorga's face which caused him to bleed from his nose; the round concluded with both fighters exchanging punches. In the 3rd round, Mayorga attempted to counter with punches to the body but did not do significant damage to his opponent, however later in the round one of these punches made Trinidad lose his balance and touch the floor with one glove which the referee counted as a knockdown. In the 4th round, both boxers traded hard combinations. In the 5th round, Trinidad displayed control of the offense's tempo injuring Mayorga and opening a cut under one of his eyes. This pattern continued in the 6th and 7th round, and the cut on Mayorga's face began to swell. In the 8th round, Trinidad scored several knockdowns, Mayorga continued after two knockdowns, but lost by technical knockout following a third knockdown.

Mayorga vs. De La Hoya

Oscar De La Hoya (37–4-0) took a layoff of 20 months before signing to fight Mayorga. In the buildup to the fight, Mayorga insulted everything from De La Hoya's sexuality to his wife and child, but when they fought on May 6, 2006, De La Hoya knocked Mayorga down in the first minute of the fight with a left hook. De La Hoya knocked him out in the 6th round to take his tenth world title.

Mayorga vs. Vargas
It was confirmed on May 13, 2007, that Fernando Vargas (26-4-0) would face Mayorga on September 8, 2007, on Showtime PPV for the vacant WBC Continental Americas super middleweight title. However the fight was postponed after it was discovered during a routine blood test that Vargas was suffering from a severe iron deficiency. Doctors ordered Vargas not to participate in the upcoming bout until he received the necessary weeks of treatment to correct the problem. When the bout eventually took place it would be fought at 162 pounds, a weight that neither boxer has ever fought at. Many sources claim that Vargas had complained about fighting at the Jr. Middleweight limit of 154 pounds, stating that it's "too much for his body to take". Vargas has stated that fighting at that weight was the reason he did poorly against Mosley in the second fight.

Vargas claimed that this would be the last fight of his career regardless of the result. He warned Mayorga that he would not tolerate any insults from him like the ones he hurled at De La Hoya in their press conferences. Vargas stayed true to his promise when at the first official press conference for the fight, Mayorga said some offensive things towards Vargas and attempted to slap him. Vargas immediately jumped up from his seat and retaliated with punches and a brawl broke out between the two fighters' camps, though order was quickly restored. Vargas also recalled the time when Mayorga said Vargas was scared of him when he had defeated Javier Castillejo, then was stripped of his WBC light middleweight title rather than face Mayorga, who then defeated Michele Piccirillo for the vacant title. Ultimately the contestants faced off, and Mayorga defeated Vargas by majority decision on November 23, 2007. The scores were 113-113, 114–112, and 115–111. Crucially, Vargas was knocked down in the 1st round and again in the 11th round. Post-fight Mayorga apologized to Vargas and the two forgave each other. Vargas officially declared his retirement soon after.

Mayorga vs. Mosley
In August 2008, it was announced that Shane Mosley (44–5-0) would fight at light middleweight against Mayorga. The fight was to take place at Home Depot Center in California on September 27, 2008. The first time since 2000 that Mosley would fight in his home state. The fight was for the vacant WBA Inter-Continental light middleweight title. Mosley was guaranteed $1 million. During the first three rounds of the bout, the harder puncher appeared to be Mayorga, who landed right hands from long range. Mayorga's roughhousing mixed with his usual showboating antics seemed to bother Mosley, who appeared more uncomfortable and agitated. In recklessly lunging in with wild power shots of his own, Mosley wound up falling into more clinches and getting caught with punches he should have avoided. Mosley settled down and found the distance in the 4th round and took the next three rounds by timing Mayorga with overhand rights that landed and occasionally following up with short hooks and single body shots. Mosley continued with right hands in the seventh and eighth rounds. Mosley was able to land single power shots in the late rounds, but threw very few combinations. At times Mayorga beat Mosley to the punch with lead right hands. Near the end of the eleventh round, Mosley landed a right hand that splattered blood from Mayorga's mouth. With less than a minute left in the bout, put Mayorga down on his hands and knees. Mayorga got up on unsteady legs; Mosley stepped in with a short, lead left hook that put Mayorga flat on his back at the bell, resulting in the referee waving the bout off. At the time of stoppage, two judges had Mosley ahead with scored of 107-102 and 105–104, whilst the third judge had Mayorga ahead 105–104. Had the fight gone to scorecards, Mosley would have won via unanimous decision due to the last round being a 10–7.

Mayorga vs. Cotto

On January 19, 2011, in a press conference at Times Square, New York, Bob Arum and Don King, working together for the first time in five years, officially announced that Miguel Cotto (35-2-0) would defend his WBA light middleweight title against Mayorga at the MGM Grand Garden Arena in Las Vegas, Nevada on March 12, 2011, live on Showtime PPV. In front of 7,247 at the MGM, Cotto defeated Mayorga via TKO in the 12th round, retaining his WBA light middleweight title. Throughout the fight, Mayorga looked to engage, however the discipline on Cotto played a big part in the win, saving his big shots for the final round. A left hook ended, which dropped Mayorga ended the bout. At the time of stoppage, Cotto was ahead by five points on all three judges' scorecards. With the win, Cotto's record for world title fights improved to (17-2). Cotto earned $1 million from the fight and compubox stats showed that Cotto out punched Mayorga 249 to 176 in total punches. In the post-fight, Cotto explained how he won the fight, "The game plan was not to get caught up in any of his antics. He was very heavy handed, I felt his punches the whole fight." He also mentioned how before the last round, his trainer Emanuel Steward told him he would be able to stop Mayorga in the last round, which was the conclusion of the fight.

Mayorga vs. Mosley II
Mayorga decided to make a comeback as a boxer and won two fights in 2014, after over three-and-a-half years since losing to Cotto. He was then scheduled to rematch Mosley (47–9–1) in a fight on pay-per-view at The Forum located in Inglewood, California on August 29, 2015. Mosley would again defeat Mayorga, this time by KO in the sixth round.

Mixed martial arts career
On May 15, 2010, Mayorga was scheduled to make his professional MMA debut against UFC veteran Din Thomas on the Shine Fights: Worlds Collide: Mayorga vs. Thomas card. Don King filed for an injunction the week of the fight to prevent him from participating, claiming Mayorga had an exclusive contract with Don King Promotions (DKP).

Shine Fights stated that Mayorga's contract with DKP was for boxing, and as such did not apply to mixed martial arts. Judge Marc Gold granted the injunction just several hours before the fight. Later on the same day, Shine Fights officials conceded defeat in the matter and Mayorga was pulled off the card.

Following his retirement from boxing, Mayorga decided to properly embark on a professional MMA career and faced Wesley Tiffer on May 3, 2013. He was kept on the ground but able to survive round 1. Tiffer continued to grapple with him on the ground until Mayorga landed a controversial and illegal knee to Tiffer's spine, which left Tiffer screaming in pain. Mayorga won via TKO after Tiffer didn't answer the bell for round 3. The Nicaraguan Mixed Martial Arts Commission declared the fight a No Contest for the illegal knee a week later on May 10, 2013, and also suspended Mayorga for 3 months for being 20 pounds over the contracted weight limit of 165-lbs.

Life outside boxing
In the aftermath of his loss to the aforementioned Cotto, Mayorga went on record to state that he doesn't entirely dismiss the possibility of a comeback. Sources close to him predicted that he would return to the sport to face Antonio Margarito in a bout that would've supposedly been dubbed: "When villains collide", with the winner earning themselves one final shot at being able to resurrect their career and the loser permanently retiring from boxing – a fight that would've entertained fans not only at a press conference, but also inside the ring as well.

As of 2022, this match has not taken place.

Professional boxing record

Mixed martial arts record

|Loss
|align=center|0–3 (1)
|Sergio Ortiz
|Submission (armbar)
|World Series of Fighting 2: Central America
|
|align=center|2
|align=center|4:23
|Pharaoh's Casino, Managua, Nicaragua
|
|-
|Loss
|align=center|0–2 (1)
|Sergio Ortiz
|Decision (split)
|CRF 6: Center Real Fights
|
|align=center|3
|align=center|5:00
|San José, Costa Rica, Costa Rica
|
|-
|Loss
|align=center|0–1 (1)
|René Martinez
|Submission (guillotine choke)
|World Series of Fighting 1: Central America
|
|align=center|1
|align=center|1:45
|Nicaragua National Football Stadium, Managua, Nicaragua
|
|-
|
|align=center|0–0 (1)
|Wesley Tiffer
|No Contest (illegal knee)
|Omega MMA: Battle of the Americas
|
|align=center|2
|align=center|5:00
|Pharaoh's Casino, Managua, Nicaragua
|

Pay-per-view bouts

See also
List of welterweight boxing champions
List of light middleweight boxing champions

References

External links

Ricardo Mayorga profile at About.com

 

1973 births
Doping cases in boxing
Living people
Nicaraguan male boxers
Nicaraguan sportspeople in doping cases
Sportspeople from Managua
World Boxing Association champions
World Boxing Council champions
Nicaraguan male mixed martial artists
Mixed martial artists utilizing boxing
The Ring (magazine) champions
Light-welterweight boxers
Super-middleweight boxers
World welterweight boxing champions
World light-middleweight boxing champions